Renewal is a 2008 feature-length documentary film about religious-environmental activists. Directed and produced by American filmmakers Marty Ostrow and Terry Kay Rockefeller, the film includes eight stories that represent the growing religious-environmental movement. Each story is set in a different religious-tradition, addressing a different environmental concern. Renewal began airing on public television stations in the United States in April 2009.

Stories

The eight stories in Renewal are:
 A Crime Against Creation: Evangelicals bear witness to mountaintop removal mining and the destruction of Appalachia  (11:20 min.)
 Going Green: GreenFaith in New Jersey helps congregations take the first steps to environmental action  (14:20 min)
 Food for Faith: Muslim tradition and charity forge bonds between urban communities and sustainable farms in Illinois  (14:50 min)
 Ancient Roots: The Teva Learning Center and Adamah in Connecticut bring environmental education together with Jewish tradition  (17:30 min) 
 Compassion in Action: Green Sangha, a Buddhist community in northern California, leads a campaign to save trees  (11:10 min) 
 Eco-Justice: The Holy Spirit inspires a battle against industrial contamination in small-town Mississippi  (11:30 min)
 Sacred Celebration: Catholics and Native Americans embrace religious ritual in a struggle to protect New Mexico’s land and water   (9:30 min)
 Interfaith Power and Light: Across America people of all faiths mount a religious response to global warming  (9:25 min)

Presentation history
 In honor of World Environment Day 2008, Renewal was screened at the United Nations. 
 Renewal is featured in Humane Society of the United States’ “All Creatures Great and Small Campaign.”
 Voted “Best of Fest” at the Hazel Wolf Environmental Film Festival in Seattle.
 Screened by over 1000 Interfaith Power and Light-affiliated congregations, in 29 states.
 Showcased as a workshop at Bioneers by the Bay, a conference dedicated to visionary and practical solutions for restoring the Earth and its inhabitants.
 An official selection of the Wild and Scenic Environmental Film Festival and National Tour, the largest environmental film festival in the United States, a festival for activists by activists.

DVD release
The Renewal DVD includes the 90-minute sequence of the eight stories, as well as uncut stand-alone versions of the stories.  It is being promoted as a flexible tool for community action groups, congregations, religious and environmental organizations.

See also
 Religion and environmentalism
 Spiritual ecology
 Yale Forum on Religion and Ecology

References

External links
 Film Web Site
 Interfaith Power and Light
 GreenFaith
 

Environmentalism and religion
American documentary films
Documentary films about religion in the United States
Documentary films about environmental issues
2008 films
2008 in the environment
2008 documentary films
Films about activists
2000s English-language films
2000s American films